The  is a freight-only railway company in Kanagawa Prefecture, Japan, abbreviated as . The third-sector company (in the Japanese sense) was founded in 1963. The company also operates real-estate businesses such as warehouses. The Honmoku Line in Yokohama mainly transports containers for the Port of Yokohama, while the other three lines in Kawasaki mainly transport chemical products and petroleum for the Keihin Industrial Area.

Lines
The first three lines listed below are situated in Kawasaki and opened in 1963. The Honmoku line is situated at Yokohama and opened in 1969.

Ukishima Line (浮島線)
Kawasaki Freight—Ukishimachō: 3.9 km
Chidori Line (千鳥線)
Kawasaki Freight—Chidorichō: 8.6 km
Mizue Line (水江線)
Kawasaki Freight—Mizuechō: 2.6 km
Honmoku Line (本牧線)
—Honmoku-Futō: 5.6 km

See also
List of railway companies in Japan

References

This article incorporates material from the corresponding article in the Japanese Wikipedia

External links 

 Official website

Railway companies of Japan
Rail transport in Kanagawa Prefecture
Railway companies established in 1963